Menorca is a small island in the Mediterranean Sea belonging to Spain. Along with Majorca, Ibiza, and Formentera it is part of the Balearic Islands. It has a population of approximately 88,000. It is located 39°47' to 40°00'N, 3°52' to 4°24'E. It is a dry island without many wetlands or river systems; many of the wetlands in Menorca were drained to provide agricultural land. Despite this dragonflies are abundant on Menorca and in summer any pool of water will be alive with them. The best months to see dragonflies are May to September.

The taxonomy follows that of Dijkstra, K-D.B & Lewington, R. (2006).

Suborder Zygoptera (damselflies) 

Family Calopterygidae (demoiselles)
Calopteryx haemorrhoidalis, copper demoiselle - locally abundant in the right habitat

Family Lestidae (emerald damselflies or spreadwings)
Sympecma fusca, winter damselfly - can be found in the winter months as S. fusca overwinters as an adult.
Lestes viridis (Chalcolestes viridis), willow emerald damselfly - locally abundant
Lestes barbarus, southern emerald damselfly - scarce

Family Coenagrionidae (blue, blue-tailed and red damselflies)
Ischnura elegans, blue-tailed damselfly - common all over the island.
Ceriagrion tenellum, small red damselfly - local
Coenagrion caerulescens, Mediterranean bluet - rare
Erythromma lindenii (Cercion lindenii), blue-eye, also called the goblet-marked damselfly.

Suborder Anisoptera (dragonflies)

Family Aeshnidae (hawkers and emperors)

Aeshna affinis, blue-eyed hawker
Aeshna mixta, migrant hawker
A. affinis and A. mixta are very alike in appearance. Blue aeshna are frequently seen in late summer but there are not many positive identifications of either species on record.
Aeshna isoceles often put into the genus Anaciaeschna, green-eyed hawker - this species flies early in the year and is the only brown aeshna found on Menorca. Can  be seen in the Algendar gorge.
Anax imperator, emperor dragonfly also called blue emperor - common
Anax parthenope, lesser emperor

Family Libellulidae (chasers, skimmers and darters)

Libellula depressa, broad-bodied chaser
Orthetrum cancellatum, black-tailed skimmer - fairly common
Orthetrum coerulescens, keeled skimmer - fairly common
Sympetrum striolatum, common darter - common
Sympetrum fonscolombii, red-veined darter - common
crocothemis erythraea, scarlet dragonfly or broad scarlet - fairly common

Most darters seen in Menorca with a very red colouring are S. fonscolombii but some are C. erythraea which occurs in many of the same locations. On close observation these two species can be told apart as they have quite different body shapes. Also S. fonscolombii usually oviposits in tandem whereas female C. erythraea oviposit solo.

See also 
List of butterflies of Menorca

References
 Askew, R.R. (2004) The Dragonflies of Europe. (revised ed.) Harley Books. . 
 d'Aguilar, J., Dommanget, JL., and Prechac, R. (1986) A field guide to the Dragonflies of Britain, Europe and North Africa. Collins. . 
Boudot JP., et al. (2009) Atlas of the Odonata of the Mediterranean and North Africa. Libellula Supplement 9:1-256.
 Dijkstra, K-D.B & Lewington, R. (2006) Field Guide to the Dragonflies of Britain and Europe. British Wildlife Publishing. .
 Ocharan, F.J., (1987) Neuvos datos sobre los odonatos de Menorca (Espana). ''Bol. R. Soc. Espanola Hist. Nat. (Biol.). 83 (1-4):155-161

External links 
 http://www.iberianwildlife.com/spain/dragonflies-damselflies-spain.htm
 Images of the wildlife of Menorca

Fauna of the Balearic Islands
Environment of Menorca
Dragonflies, Menorca